Mithat is a variant of the Arabic name Midhat given name for males. People named Mithat include:

 Mithat Bayrak, Turkish sport wrestler
 Mithat Demirel, German basketball player
 Mithat Yıldırım (born 1966), Turkish cross-country skier

See also
 Midhat

Turkish masculine given names

de:Midhat